Asgardsrei festival (Norwegian: 'The Ride of Asgard') is an annual National Socialist black metal (NSBM) festival in Kyiv, Ukraine.

As a NSBM and white power music festival, it is one of the most popular events for far-right and neo-Nazi extremists and a meeting ground for white supremacist networks and organizations across Europe and America. Several of the organizers and bands regularly playing at the club Bingo during Asgardsrei festival have been convicted of murders, assaults and other hate crimes, and belong to organizations classified as terrorist groups by several European courts. It is named after the 1999 album by Absurd with the same name, which was seen as influential to the National Socialist black metal scene. Such bands that are participating in the festival include Absurd, Peste Noire, Goatmoon, M8L8TH, and Nokturnal Mortum.

The festival is strongly connected to Alexey Levkin of М8Л8ТХ, and his "Militant Zone" label, who act as organizers and originally founded the festival in Moscow in 2012. Levkin and the Militant Zone are heavily involved in the Ukrainian nationalist, Azov Battalion.

References

Alt-right events
Black metal controversies
Neo-Nazism in Ukraine
Obscenity controversies in music
2010s in Europe
Music festivals in Ukraine
National Socialist black metal
Satanism and Nazism